Bedford Phoenix Incorporated was formed in 2014 as a result of the amalgamation of the Bedford Group and the Phoenix Society. Operating across regional South Australia and metropolitan Adelaide, Bedford provides supported employment, supported independent living, and NDIS services to people with disabilities. Total revenue in 2014–2015 was $62,056,000, with a profit of $3,600,000.

History

Bedford Industries
1920 the Civilian Tubercular and Cancer Comforts Fund
1943 South Australian Tuberculosis Association Incorporated (SATAI)
1945 Bedford Industries at Glenelg
1949 moved to Panorama fundraising commenced in 1946 with a promise to match funds up to £20,000 from the Government of South Australia and £1,000 of the Societies funds
2010 took on responsibility for Heritage Industries in Mount Gambier

Phoenix Society
Origins in The South Australian Standing Committee for the Welfare of the Physically Handicapped, of the SA Council of Social Services (SACOSS)
May 1958 Phoenix Society formed
1959, with a workshop in Carrington Street, Adelaide
1962 Eastwood facility
1979–1988 Torrensville Assessment and Training Centre
1981 second workshop facility

People

Bedford Industries
Darcy Rivers Warren Cowan championed the establishment of Bedford Industries
Ted Byrt
Neil Sachse

Phoenix Society
Gordon Maxwell Reid, MBE was appointed Life Governor of Phoenix Society in 1977.

References

External links

Health charities in Australia
Organizations established in 1920
Disability organisations based in Australia
2014 establishments in Australia
Medical and health organisations based in South Australia